Henk Marcel Dost (born 28 September 1969 in Zierikzee) is a retired decathlete from the Netherlands, who represented his native country at the 1996 Summer Olympics in Atlanta, United States. There he finished in 18th place in the men's decathlon competition, earning a total number of 8.111 points. The other competitor from the Netherlands, Jack Rosendaal, ended up in 21st place.

Achievements

References
  Dutch Olympic Committee
  sports-reference

1969 births
Living people
Dutch decathletes
Olympic athletes of the Netherlands
Athletes (track and field) at the 1996 Summer Olympics
Universiade medalists in athletics (track and field)
Sportspeople from Zierikzee
Universiade bronze medalists for the Netherlands
Medalists at the 1997 Summer Universiade